Madrona Creek is a stream in the Madrona neighborhood of Seattle, Washington, United States, located within Madrona Park. A daylighting project to restore the creekbed from above 38th Avenue downhill to Lake Washington is underway .

References
http://www.ci.seattle.wa.us/parks/maintenance/MadronaCreek.htm

Landforms of Seattle
Rivers of Washington (state)
Subterranean rivers of the United States
Rivers of King County, Washington